Love Island (stylized as love island and also known as Love Island USA outside of the U.S. and domestically starting with season 4) is an American dating reality show based on the British series Love Island. The series was announced and commissioned on August 8, 2018, by CBS. It premiered on July 9, 2019, on CBS. The series was hosted by Arielle Vandenberg for its first three seasons; Sarah Hyland replaced Vandenberg as host starting with the fourth season.

On August 1, 2019, the show was renewed for a second season and was originally scheduled to premiere on May 21, 2020. However, due to the ongoing COVID-19 pandemic in the United States, the production was postponed. The second season production moved to The Cromwell Las Vegas with strict quarantine measures in place. It premiered on August 24, 2020. On January 27, 2021, the series was renewed for a third season, which was filmed in Hawaii. The third season premiered on July 7, 2021.

In February 2022, the series was picked up for its fourth and fifth seasons by Peacock. The fourth season takes place in California, and premiered on July 19, 2022. The fifth season is scheduled to premiere in 2023.

Format
Love Island involves a group of contestants, referred to as Islanders, living in isolation from the outside world in a villa, constantly under video surveillance. To survive in the villa the Islanders must be coupled up with another Islander, whether it be for love, friendship or survival, as the overall winning couple receives $100,000. On the first day, the Islanders couple up for the first time based on first impressions, but over the duration of the series, they are forced to "re-couple" where they can choose (or be chosen) to remain in their current couple or swap and change.

Any Islander who remains single after the coupling is eliminated and "dumped" from the island. Islanders can also be eliminated via a public vote during the series. The public can vote for their favorite couple or who they think is the most compatible through the Love Island app available on smartphones. Couples who receive the fewest votes risk being eliminated. Occasionally, twists may occur where the islanders must eliminate each other. During the final week, the public vote for which couple they want to win the series and take home the prize.

Whilst in the villa, each Islander has their own phone with which they can only contact other Islanders via text – or receive texts informing them of the latest challenges, dumping, or re-coupling. Islanders and couples must typically take part in many games and challenges designed to test their physical and mental abilities, with the winners receiving special prizes afterward. Some Islanders are also sent on dates outside the villa, or can win dates by winning challenges. Occasionally, a pair of islanders are chosen to be sent to The Hideaway, where they are able to spend one night together apart from the other couples.

Production

Development
On February 22, 2006, it was announced that an American version of Celebrity Love Island was in development at MyNetworkTV, but the show was not produced. On August 8, 2018, it was reported that CBS acquired the rights to an American non-celebrity version of the series from ITV Studios and Motion Content Group with David George, Adam Sher, and David Eilenberg serving as executive producers. Simon Thomas, Mandy Morris, Ben Thursby, Richard Foster, and Chet Fenster later joined the series as additional executive producers in addition to the original three. Arielle Vandenberg was later announced to be hosting the series.

The first season of Love Island ran from July 9, 2019, to August 7, 2019. The show was renewed for a second season on August 1, 2019, while the first season was still being broadcast. On January 27, 2021, it was announced that the show was renewed for a third season, this time taking place in Hawaii. On May 13, 2021, it was announced that the third season would premiere on July 7, 2021. On February 23, 2022, the series was renewed for a fourth and fifth season and moved to Peacock in summer 2022. The fourth season took place in California.

Broadcast
Love Island opened with a 90-minute premiere on July 9, 2019, and aired every weeknight through August 7, 2019, for a total of 22 episodes in its first season. In addition to the CBS broadcasts, the series is simulcast on CTV in Canada, with the second season also airing in Australia on the 9Now streaming platform. In the United Kingdom, it also aired on ITVBe in 2019 then later ITV2 in 2020. ITVBe acquired its third season.

Series overview

Viewing figures

See also
 Big Brother

Links
CBS version
Peacock version

References

2010s American reality television series
2019 American television series debuts
2020s American reality television series
American dating and relationship reality television series
American television series based on British television series
CBS original programming
English-language television shows
Love Island (franchise)
Peacock (streaming service) original programming
Television series by ITV Studios